Maghi da Mela (Punjabi: ਮਾਘੀ ਦਾ ਮੇਲਾ ), held at the holy city of Sri Muktsar Sahib each year in January  or the month of Magh according to Nanakshahi calendar and it is one of the most important melas or fairs of India and the most important of all religiously significant gatherings of the Sikhs.

Guru Gobind  Singh  Ji chose Maghi as one of the three festivals to be celebrated by Sikhs (the others are Baisakhi and Bandhi chor divas (Diwali))

After the battle of Sri Muktsar Sahib which took place on 8 May 1705, (21 Vaisakh 1762 Bikrami calendar) Maghi came to be associated with the forty Sikhs and the battle of Sri Muktsar Sahib.

The Maghi fair is held to honour the memory of the forty Sikh warriors killed during the Battle of Muktsar in 1705. Muktsar, originally called Khidrana, was named as Muktsar ("the pool of liberation") following the battle. These forty Sikhs, led by their leader Mahan Singh, had formally deserted Sri Guru Gobind Singh ji in the need of hour, and signed a written memorandum to the effect. When Mai Bhago, a valiant and upright lady, heard of this cowardly act, she scolded the Singh's and inspired them refresh with spirit of bravery for which Sikhs are known. Hence, the unit returned and joined the Guru who was already engaged in action at Khidrana. All forty of them attained martyrdom. The memorandum (bedawa) was torn-down by the Guru himself just before Mahan Singh died.

People gather from all over Punjab, even other parts of India to join the festival which is in fact spread over many days. Merchants display their wares for sale, which include from trinkets to high-end electronics, the weapons Nihangs bear and especially agricultural machinery (since most around are farmers). The country's biggest circuses, Apollo and Gemini, are there as a matter of rule, merry-go-rounds and giant wheels, and the famous Well of Death (trick motorcycling inside consortium of wood planks) are the special attraction for children.

While kids enjoy the rides, there are tuck shops that are quite a find. Women buy crockery and home decor, men mostly interest in special (name embedded on rice grain) keyrings, posters. Kids have special corner for toys and other things. The shops sell out goggles, kitchen utensils, makeup, shoes and clothes, all in average quality and lowest market possible cost. You don't need big bucks to shop a lot. However, very limited use of electronic payments is done, as the end merchant is a poor villager, hardly touched by digital world.

It is also a very important occasion from the political point of view, as all the significant politicos, including the chief minister are there on the main day. All major political leaders/ parties hold separate stages to throw political dirt at one another. Such arrangement needs extremely tight police -up which is met by calling out forces, sometimes even CRPF and BSF battalions from neighboring areas.

See also 

 List of Sikh festivals

References

Sikh practices
Sri Muktsar Sahib
Sikh festivals
Religious festivals in India